Hibbertia pachyphylla is a species of flowering plant in the family Dilleniaceae and is endemic to Western Australia. It is a shrub with thick, oblong leaves and yellow flowers with five stamens in a bundle on one side of two hairy carpels.

Description
There are five stamens fused at the base on one side of two hairy carpels that each contain two ovules. Flowering occurs from September to November.

Taxonomy
Hibbertia pachyphylla was first formally described in 2004 by Judith R. Wheeler in the journal Nuytsia from specimens collected by E.C. Nelson near the road between Hyden and Norseman in 1973. The specific epithet (pachyphylla) means "thick-leaved".

Distribution and habitat
This hibbertia grows in mallee woodland and scrub on sandy soil in scattered locations in the Coolgardie and Mallee biogeographic regions of Western Australia.

Conservation status
Hibbertia pachyphylla is classified as "not threatened" by the Western Australian Government Department of Parks and Wildlife.

See also
List of Hibbertia species

References

pachyphylla
Flora of Western Australia
Plants described in 2004